The Northern Mazghuna Pyramid is an ancient Egyptian royal tomb which was built during the 12th or 13th Dynasty in Mazghuna, 5 km south of Dahshur. The building remained unfinished, and it is still unknown which pharaoh was really intended to be buried here since no appropriate inscription has been found.

The pyramid was rediscovered in 1910 by Ernest Mackay and excavated in the following year by Flinders Petrie.

Attribution
When the two Mazghuna pyramids were rediscovered, scholars noticed many structural similarities between those two and Amenemhat III's pyramid at Hawara; for this reason the southern pyramid was attributed to the son and successor of this king, Amenemhat IV. Subsequently, the northern pyramid was attributed to the female-pharaoh Sobekneferu, sister of Amenemhat IV and last ruler of the 12th Dynasty.

However, some scholars such as William C. Hayes believed that the two Mazghuna pyramids were built during the 13th Dynasty, on the basis of some similarities with the pyramid of Khendjer. In this case, the northern pyramid should have belonged to one of the many pharaohs who ruled between the beginning of the 13th Dynasty and the loss of control of the northern territory occurred during or  after the reign of Merneferre Ay.

Description

The hypogeum is similar to the one of the southern pyramid but much more tortuous, changing direction six times. The entrance is on the north side. From there, a staircase leads down to a square chamber and then to another staircase and to the first quartzite blocking. After that, two other chambers are connected by a passage with a second, still unsealed blocking. After the third chamber, a stairway and then a corridor leads to the antechamber just prior to the large burial chamber: this room, partially covered by an inverted V-shaped ceiling, is entirely filled by a huge sarcophagus-vault, which was carved from a single block of quartzite. The never-used sarcophagus lid, a 42-ton quartzite slab, still awaits to be fitted in the chamber. All exposed quartzite, which was built in the pyramid, had been painted with red paint and sometimes also decorated with vertical black stripes. The function of a large room behind the burial chamber remain unknown.

From the pyramid complex, the valley temple, the funerary temple and the enclosure walls had apparently left no traces. Only a large portion of the causeway has been discovered, as well as another blocking stone, likely abandoned due to a change of the pyramid's design.

See also 
 List of Egyptian pyramids

References

Rainer Stadelmann, Die ägyptischen Pyramiden. Vom Ziegelbau zum Weltwunder. Verlag Philipp von Zabern, 3. Aufl., Mainz 1997, p. 251,  
Miroslav Verner, Die Pyramiden. Rowohlt Verlag, Reinbek 1998, pp. 472–474, .

External links

 The Mazghuna Pyramids

19th century BC in Egypt
18th century BC in Egypt
Pyramids of the Twelfth Dynasty of Egypt
Pyramids of the Thirteenth Dynasty of Egypt
Buildings and structures completed in the 18th century BC
2nd-millennium BC establishments in Egypt